Chhabra is a city and a municipality in Baran district in the state of Rajasthan, India, near to the border with Madhya Pradesh. Chhabra is a historic walled city with a fort. Its name comes from the six gates in the walls.

Geography
It has an average elevation of 321 metres (1053 feet). Chhabra is connected with broad gauge line and is well connected to Jaipur, Kota, Indore, Jabalpur etc. by Express and Passenger trains.

Demographics
 India census, Chhabra had a population of 32,285. Males constitute 52.172% of the population and females 47.827%. Literacy rate of Chhabra city is 72.84% higher than state average of 66.11%. In Chhabra. Male literacy is around 82.09% while female literacy rate is 62.87%.
Population of Children with age of 0-6 is 4649 which is 14.40% of total population of Chhabra (M). In Chhabra Municipality, Female Sex Ratio is of 917 against state average of 928. Moreover, Child Sex Ratio in Chhabra is around 857 compared to Rajasthan state average of 888.

Culture
Hadoti is the most spoken language of the city followed by Hindi.

Thermal power plant 

Chhabra has a thermal power plant which is operational. The second phase (4 X 250 MW) and (2 X 660 ) of the Thermal Power Plant is in running condition. This plant is owned by RRVUNL and as per information available on the web site of RRVUNL the second phase is likely to become operational in December 2011. The proposed capacity of thermal power plant is 2,320 MW now.

See also 
Chhabra (Rajasthan Assembly constituency)

Chhabra Thermal Power Plant

References

Cities and towns in Baran district